is a former Japanese football player and manager.

Playing career
Mochizuki was born in Shizuoka on November 20, 1961. After graduating from University of Tsukuba, he joined Japan Soccer League club Mazda (later Sanfrecce Hiroshima) in 1984. Although he was goalkeeper, he could not play at all in the match and he retired in 1988. After retirement, he became a coach at Mazda. In 1992, Japan Soccer League was folded and founded new league J1 League. However he returned as player because the club had few goalkeepers in 1992. However he did not play in the match and retired end of 1994 season.

Coaching career
After retirement, Mochizuki started coaching career at Mazda (later Sanfrecce Hiroshima) in 1988. He mainly served as goalkeeper coach. In November 1998, he became a goalkeeper coach for Japan national team under manager Philippe Troussier. He also coached for U-20 Japan at 1999 World Youth Championship and U-23 Japan at 2000 Summer Olympics. At 1999 World Youth Championship, Japan won the 2nd place. In October 2000, Japan senior team won the champions Asian Cup. In 2001, he returned to Sanfrecce and became a goalkeeper coach. In April 2006, manager Takeshi Ono was sacked and Mochizuki became a new manager as Ono successor. He managed the club in 4 matches until June. In June, the club signed with Mihailo Petrović as new manager and Mochizuki returned to Goalkeeper coach. He coached top team until 2011. He became a director for youth team in 2012 and became a manager for youth team in 2013. He managed youth team until 2014.

Club statistics

Managerial statistics

References

External links

1961 births
Living people
University of Tsukuba alumni
Association football people from Shizuoka Prefecture
Japanese footballers
Japan Soccer League players
J1 League players
Sanfrecce Hiroshima players
Japanese football managers
J1 League managers
Sanfrecce Hiroshima managers
Association football goalkeepers